U.S. Route 67 (US 67) is the portion of a north-south highway in Missouri that starts at the Arkansas state line south of Neelyville and ends at the Illinois state line northeast of West Alton.

Route description
Going from south to north, US 67 enters Missouri at the Arkansas state line. At the southwest corner of Poplar Bluff, Business Route 67 goes into Poplar Bluff while US 67 bypasses Poplar Bluff to the west on a freeway-grade highway. It then joins US 60 at the northwest corner of Poplar Bluff.

Construction is complete to divide the highway through Wayne, Madison and Butler Counties, including bypasses around Greenville and Cherokee Pass. The new divided highway opened on August 19, 2011, with a ribbon-cutting ceremony. Additionally, MoDOT has extended the divided highway south to US 160 south of Poplar Bluff.

From Fredericktown, US 67 passes through Farmington, where an existing interchange with Route 221 was converted to a diverging diamond interchange in September 2012. US 67 then proceeds through Park Hills, Desloge, and Bonne Terre. This becomes known as Truman Boulevard in Festus and Crystal City, Highway 61-67 from Herculaneum to Imperial, and Jeffco Boulevard from Arnold until it exits Jefferson County and enters St. Louis County, where it becomes Lemay Ferry Road.

St. Louis County 

When US 67/61 reaches St. Louis County, it travels Lemay Ferry Road (Route 267) until it reaches Lindbergh Boulevard. There it travels Lindbergh Boulevard (known as Kirkwood Road in Kirkwood). US 61 then turns west onto I-64/US 40 West towards Wentzville. Lindbergh, named for aviator Charles Lindbergh, continues north through Frontenac, Ladue, Creve Coeur, Maryland Heights, Bridgeton, Hazelwood and Florissant until it reaches Lewis & Clark Boulevard (Route 367). From there, it continues straight north to West Alton, Missouri and then crosses the Mississippi River on the Clark Bridge and enters Alton, Illinois.

The only vehicular tunnel in Missouri is located on US 67 at Lambert-St. Louis International Airport, where the road tunnels under the runway.

History
The northern terminus was at Alt. US 61 near Fredericktown, Missouri, in 1926.  The route was extended north on Illinois Route 3 (through western Illinois) to its northern terminus in Rock Island, Illinois by 1932.  Sometime after 1940, US 67 was routed into Madison County.  Then, it was co-signed with Route 66 as both routes went across the McKinley Bridge.

By the mid-1940s, US 67 had been rerouted from St. Louis to Alton via the Lewis Bridge over the Missouri River and the Clark Bridge (formerly the Old Clark Bridge) over the Mississippi River. The Alton to Jerseyville section now passed through Godfrey and Delhi. By the mid-1950s, a more direct route for US 67 from Godfrey to Jacksonville via Greenfield had opened. Heading north from Downtown Alton, US 67 was rerouted via an abandoned railroad grade to the north end of town.

Between Fort Bellefontaine, Missouri (near Lewis Bridge) and south of St. Louis, US 67 followed two different routes. US 67 originally followed Lewis and Clark Boulevard, Florissant Avenue, 7th Street, and Broadway south through St. Louis. US 67 Bypass followed Lindbergh Boulevard around the city. Route 99 was an inner bypass within the city limits, following Kingshighway Boulevard and Riverview Boulevard between Route 30 (Gravois Road) and US 67 (Florissant Avenue). US 67 replaced Route 99 in the mid-1950s, using Loughborough Avenue at the south end, and the old route south of downtown became an extension of US 67 Alternate, which had begun downtown and crossed into Illinois towards Alton. (The old US 67 north of downtown was mostly US 66 City.) Later, in the late 1960s, US 67 moved to the bypass, and the old route, where not turned back to the city, became Route 267 and Route 367.

Future
The portion of US 67 between the Arkansas state line and Poplar Bluff is slated to be upgraded into an extension of Interstate 57. US 67 between Poplar Bluff and Route 158 is already mostly a freeway with only two at-grade intersections. Planning is underway to build the next ten miles of freeway between Route 158 and County Road 274 south of Neelyville, just 2 miles north of the Arkansas border. However, it is currently unclear as to when and where exactly the highway will tie into the Arkansas side, as the Arkansas Department of Transportation has not yet determined a route to finish their portion of the US 67 freeway. Interchange improvement at Route 158 and US Route 160 to convert it to a Dumbbell interchange starts August 22, 2022.

Junction list

References

External links

67
Transportation in Butler County, Missouri
Transportation in Wayne County, Missouri
Transportation in Madison County, Missouri
Transportation in St. Francois County, Missouri
Transportation in Jefferson County, Missouri
Transportation in St. Louis County, Missouri
Transportation in St. Charles County, Missouri
 Missouri